Mother Jones may refer to:

 Mary Harris Jones (called "Mother Jones", 1837–1930), American labor and community organizer
 Mother Jones (magazine), progressive American news magazine

See also 
 Mother Jones' Prison, formerly a National Historic Landmark in West Virginia